Seethakaathi is a 2018 Tamil-language magic realism comedy film written and directed by Balaji Tharaneetharan, starring Vijay Sethupathi in his 25th lead role in a film. The film began production in April 2017. Upon release the film received very positive reviews from critics but they criticised the lengthy runtime of the film.

Plot
Ayya Aadhimoolam is a veteran theater actor who refuses to act in films because he only wants to act in front of a live audience. In recent years, due to films and various other means, Ayya's plays attract a meager audience which bothers him. During an act of Sujatha's Oonjal, Ayya dies. After his death, Ayya's assistant Parasuraman and his troupe decide to stage plays frequently. During the rehearsals of Panjali Sabadham, Parasuraman observes that two actors perform significantly better than usual. During the play, he observes that Saravanan, a budding actor performing beyond expectations and also bowing to the audience even when the curtains are closed. Parasuraman affirms that Ayya's spirit is still acting.

Saravanan's performance is also observed by Thyagu, a film director on the lookout for the male lead for his next film. He is convinced by Parasuraman that it was Ayya who acted through Saravanan. Thyagu signs Saravanan on in the hope that Ayya will act. Ayya acts through Saravanan and the film becomes a success making Saravanan a sought after actor. It is revealed that Ayya acted in the film because he liked the story of the film.

Saravanan signs a film without Parasuraman's knowledge who selects the script for him. During director Sundar's shoot, Ayya's spirit suddenly stops acting after which it is revealed to the public that Ayya acted in the films which featured Saravanan as the lead.

Various producers approach Ayya for their film and Parasumaran selects the scripts of the film on the basis of content. This makes Ayya a huge superstar in Tamil Cinema. A producer Dhanapal wants Ayya to act in his film but doesn't reveal that he inserts action and song sequences.

When Parasumaran discovers Dhanapal's involvement in this, he is aghast. Afterwards, due to Dhanapal's deception, Ayya stops acting permanently but Dhanapal who wants to complete his film at any cost pressurizes Parasumaran and Ayya's family. After lodging a complaint, the Producers' council alleges that Ayya didn't act in the first place and that they are fraudsters. The case goes to court where Ayya's family gets footage of Dhanapal's film. Dhanapal alleges that they stole his film but the film is presented as an exhibit for the Judge who observes Dhanapal's acting and tells him to act in the film but Dhanapal refuses to act which implies that Ayya acted in the film. The Judge concludes that a man cannot be separated from his art and Ayya though not here but somewhere he is there for his art. After the case ends, a statue commemorating Ayya is consecrated in front of his theater. Elsewhere, a school play is shown where the lead actor bows down for a long time implying that Ayya's spirit is still alive.

Cast

Production
Following the success of Naduvula Konjam Pakkatha Kaanom (2012), director Balaji Tharaneetharan began working on his next project titled Seethakaathi. In an interview during January 2014, Balaji revealed that the film would be based on artists and would not be related to the tale of the philanthropist of the same name. After postponing work on the film to complete the romantic comedy Oru Pakka Kathai (2017), Balaji revived Seethakaathi in April 2017 and announced that Vijay Sethupathi would portray the leading role. Produced by Sudhan Sundaram, Umesh, Jayaram and Arun Vaidyanathan of Passion Studios who earlier produced Nibunan, the film would mark the actor's 25th film. After roping in Remya Nambeesan and Gayathrie, the team signed veteran director Mahendran. Newcomer Sunil Reddy was signed to play the antagonist.

Soundtrack
The soundtrack album is composed by Govind Vasantha of '96 fame, with lyrics written by Thiyagarajan Kumararaja, Madhan Karky, Karthik Netha and Yugabharathi. This is his fourth film as composer. Junglee Music secured the audio rights. The first single track "Ayya" sung by Vijay Prakash was released on 15 October 2018. The second single "Avan" sung by Harish Sivaramakrishnan was released on 30 November 2018. The third single, an instrumental track "The Journey of Ayya" was released on 6 December 2018. The fourth single "Kozhi Onnu" sung by Pushpavanam Kuppuswamy was released on 14 December 2018. The complete soundtrack album, with seven tracks, and instrumentals were released on 17 December 2018.

Release
The film, scheduled to release on 16 November 2018, was postponed to a later date following TFPC committee and actor Udhaya's request. The makers finally confirmed that the film will be released on 20 December 2018 through the release of third look poster. Earlier, the Tamil Nadu wing of the Indian National League, a political party, had objected to the title and asked the film team to "immediately change the name of the movie," saying Seethakaathi was the name of a renowned Muslim poet.

A wax statue of Vijay Sethupathi's character was unveiled at Express Avenue Mall in Chennai and the occasion was marked by a grand event promoted by the producers of the film. The satellite rights of the film were sold to STAR Vijay.

References

External links
 

2018 films
2010s Tamil-language films
Films scored by Govind Menon
Indian romantic drama films
Films about actors
2018 romantic drama films
Films about artists